It's in the Bag is a 1944 British comedy film directed by Herbert Mason and starring Elsie Waters, Doris Waters and Ernest Butcher. Gert and Daisy try to recover a valuable lost dress. It was made by Butcher's Films. It is listed on the BFI 75 Most Wanted list of lost films, but it was given a DVD commercial release by Renown Pictures Ltd in May 2014, although the Renown version is only 63 minutes long.

Plot summary

Cast
 Elsie Waters as Gert
 Doris Waters as Daisy
 Ernest Butcher as Sam Braithwaite
 Lesley Osmond as April Vaughan
 Gordon Edwards as Alan West
 Reginald Purdell as Joe
 Irene Handl as Mrs Beam
 Vera Bogetti as Rose Trelawney
 Megs Jenkins as Peach St. Clair
 Tony Quinn as Prendergast
 Anthony Holles as Costumier

Reception
Although IMDb gives a release date of 7 February 1944, the British Film Institute states there were early December 1943 reviews in the Monthly Film Bulletin and Kinematograph Weekly.

References

External links
 BFI 75 Most Wanted entry, with extensive notes
 
 It's in the Bag at Park Circus
 It's in the Bag at BFI
 It's in the Bag at AllMovie

British comedy films
British black-and-white films
1944 comedy films
1944 films
1940s English-language films
Films directed by Herbert Mason
Films scored by Percival Mackey
1940s British films